Urophora mamarae is a species of tephritid or fruit flies in the genus Urophora of the family Tephritidae.

Distribution
Peru.

References

Urophora
Insects described in 1914
Diptera of South America